Beverly Ann Reid O'Connell (May 12, 1965 – October 8, 2017) was a United States district judge of the United States District Court for the Central District of California.

Biography

O'Connell was born Beverly Ann Reid on May 12, 1965, in Ventura, California. She received her Bachelor of Arts degree in 1986 from the University of California at Los Angeles. She received her Juris Doctor, magna cum laude, in 1990 from Pepperdine University School of Law. From 1990 to 1995, she worked at the law firm of Morrison & Foerster, where she handled a variety of civil litigation matters. She served as an Assistant United States Attorney in the Central District of California from 1995 to 2005. She served as a Superior Court Judge for Los Angeles County from 2005 to 2013. For five months in 2010 and 2011, she sat by designation on the California Court of Appeal for the Second Appellate District, Division 8. She also served as Assistant Supervising Judge with the North Valley District of the Superior Court.

Federal judicial service

On November 14, 2012, President Barack Obama nominated O'Connell to serve as a United States District Judge for the United States District Court for the Central District of California, to the seat vacated by Judge Valerie Baker Fairbank who took senior status due to a certified disability on March 1, 2012. On January 2, 2013, her nomination was returned to the President, due to the sine die adjournment of the Senate. On January 3, 2013, she was renominated to the same office. Her nomination was reported by the Senate Judiciary Committee on February 14, 2013, by voice vote. On April 15, 2013, the full U.S. Senate approved the nomination by a 92–0 vote. She received her commission on April 30, 2013.

O’Connell died on October 8, 2017, at the age of 52, three weeks after collapsing and going into a coma possibly caused by a brain aneurysm while delivering a speech to the State Bar of California.

References

External links

1965 births
2017 deaths
21st-century American judges
21st-century American women judges
Assistant United States Attorneys
California state court judges
Judges of the United States District Court for the Central District of California
People associated with Morrison & Foerster
People from Ventura, California
Pepperdine University School of Law alumni
Superior court judges in the United States
United States district court judges appointed by Barack Obama
University of California, Los Angeles alumni